Collematospora is a fungal genus in the family Trichosphaeriaceae. This is a monotypic genus, containing the single species Collematospora venezuelensis, first described by R.S. Jeng and R.F. Cain in 1976.

References

Trichosphaeriales
Monotypic Sordariomycetes genera